Nadiya or Nadiia is a female given name meaning "hope" in Ukrainian. It may refer to the following people.

In sports
Nadiya Babych (1943–2021), Ukrainian linguist and philologist
Nadiia Bielkina (born 1990), Russian and Ukrainian biathlete
Nadiya Beshevli (born 1982), Ukrainian retired swimmer
Nadiya Billova (born 1961), Ukrainian biathlete
Nadiya Bodrova (born 1961),  Ukrainian hurdler
Nadiya Borovska (born 1981), Ukrainian race walker
Nadiya Bychkova (born 1989), Ukrainian ballroom and Latin American dancer
Nadiya Didenko (born 1986), Ukrainian freestyle skier
Nadiya Dusanova (born 1987), Uzbekistani high jumper
Nadiya Filipova (born 1959), Bulgarian rowing cox
Nadiya Kazimirchuk (born 1978), Ukrainian épée fencer
Nadiia Kichenok (born 1992), Ukrainian tennis player
Nadiia Kotliar (born 1993), Ukrainian acrobatic gymnast
Nadiya Mokhnatska (born 1995), Ukrainian freestyle skier
Nadiya Myronyuk (born 1984), Ukrainian weightlifter
Nadiya Olizarenko (1953-2017), Ukrainian middle-distance runner
Nadiya Rozhon (born 1952), Ukrainian rower
Nadiya Stavko (born 1958), Ukrainian retired swimmer
Nadiya Tkachenko (born 1948), Soviet-Ukrainian pentathlete
Nadiya Volynska (born 1984), Ukrainian orienteerer and bronze medalist at the 2013 World Games

Other
Nadiya Anderson (born 1986), half of a US television personality duo
Nadiya Hussain (born 1984), English winner of The Great British Bake Off TV contest
Nadiya Meiher (born 1982), Ukrainian singer
Nadiya Savchenko (born 1981), Ukrainian officer and pilot
Nadiya Svitlychna (1939–2008), Ukrainian dissident, human rights activist, writer and editor

See also
Nadia
Nadhiya, Indian film actress

Ukrainian feminine given names